Symplocos coronata is a species of plant in the family Symplocaceae. It is endemic to Sri Lanka.

Culture
Known as "උගුඩු හල් - ugudu hal" in Sinhala.

References

 http://www.theplantlist.org/tpl1.1/record/kew-2579224

Endemic flora of Sri Lanka
coronata
Vulnerable plants